Milesia fuscicosta is a species of hoverfly in the family Syrphidae.

Distribution
Borneo.

References

Insects described in 1875
Eristalinae
Diptera of Asia
Taxa named by Jacques-Marie-Frangile Bigot